Dioptric correction is the expression for the adjustment of the optical instrument to the varying visual acuity of a person's eyes. It is the adjustment of one lens to provide compatible focus when the viewer's eyes have differing visual capabilities. One result is less strain on the eyes that allow for optimal viewing and depth and contrast focusing when composing a photograph or viewing an item through a device made of lenses or lens elements.

References

Optics